Tall-e Hajj Now Shad (also romanized as Tall-e Ḩājj Now Shād) is a village in Anarestan Rural District, Riz District, Jam County, Bushehr Province, Iran. At the 2006 census, its population was 152, in 33 families.

References 

Populated places in Jam County